Lukáš Novosad (born 22 Novemmer 1976) is a Czech male canoeist who won ten medals at individual senior level at the Wildwater Canoeing World Championships and European Wildwater Championships.

References

External links
 

1976 births
Living people
Czech male canoeists
Place of birth missing (living people)